LLO may refer to:

Lakeshore Light Opera
Lateral line organ
Lebanese Liberation Organization
Lipid-linked oligosaccharide
Listeriolysin O
Logical line of operation
Low lunar orbit
Bua Airport, by IATA code

See also
Llo